The 2016 WNBL Finals was the postseason tournament of the WNBL's 2015–16 season.

Playoff qualifying

Bracket

Semifinals

Major semifinal: (1) Townsville vs. (2) Perth

Elimination semifinal: (3) Dandenong vs. (4) South East Queensland

Preliminary final

(1) Townsville vs. (4) South East Queensland

Grand Final

Perth Lynx vs. Townsville Fire

Game 1

Game 2

Rosters

References

Women's National Basketball League Finals
finals